Giorgos Kapoutzidis (Greek Γιώργος Καπουτζίδης; , Serres) is a Greek screenwriter and actor. He is the creator of the critically successful television series  Saturday born  (original title "Σαββατογεννημένες") In the nick of time (original title "Στο παρά 5") and Greek national (original title "Εθνική Ελλάδος"), one of the most part successful shows in Greek television history, the finale attracting 3 million viewers). He has won three television awards, for the best screenplay, for the series Savatogennimenes and Sto Para Pente (twice).

In May 2006, he was the commentator for the Greek TV, ERT, in the 51st Eurovision Song Contest, which took place in Athens. He also wrote the scripts for the presenters Maria Menounos and Sakis Rouvas in both the semi-final and final. Since 2013, he is the commentator for the Hellenic Broadcasting Corporation (ERT), in the Eurovision Song Contest, alongside radio producer, Maria Kozakou.

In 2016, Kapoutzidis was selected to be the presenter of the third season of The Voice of Greece
In 2017, Giorgos returned to present The Voice and was selected to be a judge in the fifth season of Ellada Eheis Talento alongside Sakis Tanimanidis and Maria Bakodimou.

Television

References

External links 
 

Greek male television actors
Greek male screenwriters
1972 births
People from Serres
Living people
Greek LGBT actors
Eurovision commentators
Greek LGBT screenwriters

Greek Macedonians